"Je te pardonne" is a song by Congolese–French singer and rapper Maître Gims featuring Australian singer Sia (for the remix), from the album Mon cœur avait raison, released in 2015. The song was released on 18 March 2016 as the sixth single from the album.

Track listings

Charts

Weekly charts

Year-end charts

References

2015 songs
2015 singles
Gims songs
French-language songs
Songs written by Gims